The men's 110 kg weightlifting competitions at the 1976 Summer Olympics in Montreal took place on 26 July at the St. Michel Arena. It was the thirteenth appearance of the heavyweight class.

Results

References

Weightlifting at the 1976 Summer Olympics